Marián Sluka (born 22 July 1979) is a former football midfielder from Slovakia.

References

External links

1979 births
Living people
Sportspeople from Rimavská Sobota
Slovak footballers
Association football midfielders
Nemzeti Bajnokság I players
Slovak expatriate footballers
Expatriate footballers in Latvia
Expatriate footballers in Hungary
Expatriate footballers in Belarus
Expatriate footballers in Slovenia
Slovak expatriate sportspeople in Latvia
Slovak expatriate sportspeople in Hungary
Slovak expatriate sportspeople in Belarus
MŠK Rimavská Sobota players
Skonto FC players
FC Senec players
Zalaegerszegi TE players
FC Neman Grodno players
Szombathelyi Haladás footballers
BFC Siófok players
Lombard-Pápa TFC footballers
Slovak football managers